Edward John Gwynn (Donegal 1 April 1868 – 10 February 1941 Dublin) was an Irish scholar of Old Irish and Celtic literature, Provost of Trinity College Dublin from 1927 to 1937 and President of the Royal Irish Academy from 1934 to 1937.

Biography
Edward John Gwynn (1868–1941), the second son of the Very Reverend Dr John Gwynn D.D. and Lucy Josephine O'Brien, was born at Aughnagaddy in Ramelton, County Donegal while his father was Rector of Tullyaughnish (or Ramelton). As a teenager he attended St Columba's College, Rathfarnham, where his father had earlier been headmaster.

In 1885, after completing his secondary education, Edward went up to Trinity College Dublin. His father was then Lecturer in Divinity at the college. In 1888 he won a scholarship in classics. Edward graduated with distinction, winning the large gold medal for classics as well as a gold medal for ethics and logic. In 1893 he was elected a Fellow of Trinity.

From Latin and Greek Edward then turned his attention to Early Irish. His father had worked for years on the Book of Armagh, an Irish text written in Latin; Edward made ancient texts in Irish his special field. At that time Irish studies did not form part of the range of subjects which were taught at Trinity College. However, Edward was able to commence his researches under the aegis of the Royal Irish Academy, of which he was elected a member in 1896. Two years later he became its Professor of Celtic Languages. As an efficient administrator as well as a serious scholar he was to remain a key figure in the affairs of the Academy for the rest of his working life. He served as President of the Academy for the period 1934 to 1937.

In the following years Edward published numerous articles, translations and commentaries in connection with his research on ancient Irish. His best known work was his edition of the Dindshenchas, a collection of legends in prose and verse explaining the origins of Irish place names. He also translated and annotated texts concerning monastic life in Tallaght, and masterminded the production of a detailed catalogue of the Irish manuscripts in the Academy's collection.

In 1903, Edward Gwynn helped to found the School of Irish Learning in Dublin. He joined its board of governors and played an active part in its programme of lectures and seminars, which were open to the public. From 1905 to 1915 he also served as one of the Commissioners for National Education. In 1907 the post of Lecturer in Celtic Languages was created at Trinity, and Edward became its first incumbent.

At around this time a proposal to create a new college in Dublin specifically for Roman Catholic students, to which Trinity would be tied in some kind of federal structure, was causing fierce controversy. Knowing that the plan was based on incorrect assumptions and would prove unworkable Edward Gwynn spoke out against it with quiet but irrefutable logic. The plan was subsequently dropped.

Edward Gwynn gathered various honours in recognition of his services to Irish scholarship. The National University of Ireland awarded him the degree of D.Litt.Celt. in 1926, and later he received honorary doctor's degrees from the Universities of Oxford, Glasgow, Wales, and Durham.

In 1927, "E.J." was appointed Provost of Trinity College Dublin, a job for which he - a scholar with administrative skills - was ideally suited. He carried out his duties with characteristic energy and ability until halted by ill health. He had suffered some years from tuberculosis and between 1913 and 1917 had spent two periods at a sanatorium in Switzerland, which had afforded a partial recovery. A resurgence of the disease forced him to resign the Provostship in 1937; he was an invalid for the remaining four years of his life. He was made an honorary fellow in 1937.
 

After Edward Gwynn's death a colleague recalled not only his keen intellect but also "that well-known smile, so full of mellow wisdom, infinite kindness and quietly amused tolerance of the foibles and extravagances of smaller minds".

Family
Edward Gwynn married Olive Mary Ponsonby (1881–1970), daughter of Colonel Justinian Gordon Ponsonby, in 1906. The couple had five children:

 John David Gwynn (1907–1998), known as David or "J.D.", became a civil engineer and spent many years working on innovative hydro-electric and other alternative energy generation projects.
 Arthur Montague Gwynn (1908–2008), "A.M.", an entomologist turned doctor of medicine, had a varied working life which included pest control in Africa; war service in the British army (where he earned a Military Cross for bravery); Antarctic exploration; and editorship of the Medical Journal of Australia.
 Lucy Margaret ("Pic") Gwynn (1911–1987) was active in voluntary work for the welfare of students and many other causes. She married the Irish geologist and expert in quaternary studies, Professor Frank Mitchell.
 Edward Harold Gwynn (1912–2007) became a Whitehall civil servant, rising to the position of Deputy Under-Secretary of State in the Ministry of Defence.
 Olive Ruth Gwynn (1915–1981) qualified as a veterinary surgeon before she married the Irish sculptor Oisín Kelly.

Photographs

Publications
The Metrical Dindshenchas, 5 vols, Hodges Figgis, Dublin, 1903–1935
The burning of Finn's house (with J. H. Lloyd), Ériu 1 (pp 13–37), 1904
The priest and the bees, Ériu 2 (pp 82–83), 1905
The three drinking-horns of Cormac ua Cuinn (edited and translated), Ériu 2 (pp 186–188), 1905
On a source of O'Clery's Glossary, Hermathena 14:33 (pp 464–480), 1907
Notes, Ériu 3 (pp 190–193), 1907
On a source of O'Clery's Glossary, Hermathena 15:35 (pp 389–396), 1909
An unrecorded gloss, Ériu 4 (p 182), 1908–10
De arreis, Ériu 5 (pp 45–48), 1911
The monastery of Tallaght (With Walter J. Purton), Proceedings of the Royal Irish Academy XXIX (C), *1911–1912
An Irish penitential, Ériu 7 (pp 121–195), 1914
Catalogue of the Irish Manuscripts in the Library of Trinity College, Dublin (with T.K. Abbott), Hodges & Figgis, Dublin, 1921
Miscellanea: Eogan, Ériu 9 (pp 27–30), 1921–23
Tomás Costelloe and O'Rourke’s wife (with Turlough O'Reilly), Ériu 9 (pp 1–11), 1921–23
A note on O'Davoren’s glossary, Ériu 9 (pp 157–158), 1921–23
The Rule of Tallaght, Hermathena 44, second supplement, 1927
Athirne’s mother, Zeitschrift für celtische Philologie 17 (pp 153–156), 1928
The Dindshenchas in the Book of Uí Maine, Ériu 10 (pp 68–91), 1926–28
Senbriathra Fithail, Revue Celtique 46 (pp 268–271), 1929
Varia III, Ériu 11 (pp 150–153), 1932
The Book of Armagh: The Patrician Documents (ed.), Irish Manuscripts Commission, 1937
Notes on the Irish penitential, Ériu 12 (pp 245–249), 1938
An Old-Irish tract on the privileges and responsibilities of poets, Ériu 13 (pp 1–60 & 220–236), 1942

References

External links
 Edward John Gwynn Provost 1927 – 1937 (c. 1868 -1941)

1868 births
1941 deaths
Alumni of Trinity College Dublin
Fellows of Trinity College Dublin
Honorary Fellows of Trinity College Dublin
Presidents of the Royal Irish Academy
People from Ramelton
Provosts of Trinity College Dublin
Scholars of Trinity College Dublin